The U.S. Post Office-Valentine, at 348 N. Main St. in Valentine, Nebraska, was built in 1939.  It has also been known as Cherry County Sawer Memorial Library Educational Service Unit 17, Media Center.

It was listed on the National Register of Historic Places in 1991; the listing included one contributing building and two contributing objects.  It includes invited artwork by University of Nebraska art professor Kady Faulkner.

It is one of 12 Nebraska post offices featuring a Section of Fine Arts mural. The $700 mural in the post office was both praised and panned when it was originally produced.  Now the Valentine Media Center, operated by Educational Service Unit #17.

References

External links

Post office buildings on the National Register of Historic Places in Nebraska
Streamline Moderne architecture in the United States
Government buildings completed in 1939
Buildings and structures in Cherry County, Nebraska
New Deal in Nebraska
National Register of Historic Places in Cherry County, Nebraska